Orders, decorations and medals of Bulgaria are regulated by the law on the Orders and Medals of the Republic of Bulgaria of 29 May 2003.

The National Military History Museum of Bulgaria in Sofia currently has over 150 Bulgarian Orders in the collection, which it has acquired over 85 years in co-operation with the Bulgarian State Mint, which are in the main part imperial, including Orders awarded to Knjaz Alexander, Ferdinand and Tsar Boris III along with other high-ranking military leaders of the Royal Bulgarian Army.
Note: Awards shown without ribbons are/were worn in full at all times.  Also, like most items which are created by the minting process, mint errors of awards do exist, some which were still issued despite the error (such as off-centred artwork) and some which were discarded (such as incorrect reverses). These mint errors add dimensions to the art of collecting such items. Main error types will also be listed here also. Numbers of Orders/Medals that were in use in both The Tsardom of Bulgaria and The People's Republic of Bulgaria show the number awarded during both regimes and not just under the single regime.

Principality of Bulgaria/Third Bulgarian Tsardom (29 April 1879 – 15 September 1946)
The decorations of the Principality of Bulgaria (29 April 1879 – 5 October 1908) and the Third Bulgarian Tsardom (5 October 1908 – 15 September 1946) were divided into orders, medals and honorary insignia. Orders were awarded to civilians and military personnel for particularly great merits in service of the state (For example, commanding an army to a victory). Honorary insignia (Badges) were awarded for a specific merit or achievement or due to a specific event (For example, being wounded in action) and medals were presented on the occasion of a political or historic event or for merit (For example, on the anniversary of independence). Most of the Imperial commemorative medals were only issued once, to participants at the commemorated event and only the highest level personnel could be expected to be at all these events during their term in high status society. No-one was issued every commemorative medal, as during the turbulence of coups, counter-coups and change of monarchs, the high level society was in near constant change.

The Principality of Bulgaria's first order was created with Article 59 of the Tarnovo Constitution, The Order of Bravery, which came into force on 1 January 1880 (The order itself shows the date 1879 on the reverse). The highest Tsardom of Bulgaria award was the Order of Saint Cyril And Saint Methodius awarded to those who brought outstanding excellence to the culture of the Tsardom of Bulgaria (The People's Republic of Bulgaria also created an Order of the same title in three classes but that was a far lower level award for merit in education and science and is not to be confused).

Orders

Medals

Table Medals

Unofficial Medals
These "medals" were "issued" or "awarded" by various groups and organisations including government departments but were/are not fully recognised as officially awarded medals and were/are not authorised for official wear on official uniforms. That being so this does not mean by any means that these medals were simply just for sale to all comers and were/are still often held in high respect by those who were given them.

People's Republic of Bulgaria (16 September 1946 – 10 November 1989)
Note: Wider ribbons indicate 3 sided imperial type suspension/Narrower ribbons indicate 4/5 sided soviet type suspension.

With the exile of Tsar Simeon II all Imperial Bulgarian awards were discontinued and banned (Other than those created after the pro-soviet coup of 4 September 1944), including the wear of such awards. Traces of the Imperial award system were left in the following ways;
Until 13 December 1950 various awards were issued with male and female type ribbons.
Until 13 December 1950 male ribbons were still issued as a trifold, some medals such as the medal for "Participant in the Anti-Fascist Struggle" continued to have a trifold ribbon until the award was discontinued with the collapse of the People's Republic.
Two new orders were created with the same name as imperial orders, The Order "(Saint) Cyril And (Saint) Methodius" and the Order "For Bravery".
The Order of Civil Merit ribbon was used for the new Order of the People's Republic of Bulgaria (which had similar award criteria).

Honorary Titles

Orders

Medals

Republic of Bulgaria (10 November 1989 – 29 May 2003)
With the collapse of The People's Republic of Bulgaria their award system was discontinued (Officially on 5 April 1991) with the exception of orders bestowed on foreign nationals. All communist and imperial awards were allowed to be worn. The soviet style 5 sided suspension was dropped, with the exception of the medal 50th Anniversary of Victory Over Hitler's Fascism, which had a 5 sided enamel suspension and the Imperial tradition of different ribbons for different sexes were reintroduced for certain awards. Between 5 April 1991 and the introduction of The Order For Loyal Service Under The Banner in 1994 there were no official state awards for Bulgarian citizens. As of 29 May 2003 a totally new award system was introduced and as of the 9 June 2003 the previous system was officially abolished.

Titles

Orders

Medals

Republic of Bulgaria (since 29 May 2003)
Legal organisation of the current Bulgarian Honours System is contained in the Constitution and the Decree on Intellectual Stimulation. Orders are established by the National Assembly and are awarded by the President of the Republic. The nomination of a foreign person is made by the Ministry of External Affairs, whereas Bulgarian nominees are selected by the Council of Ministers.

Titles

Orders

Medals

Table Medals

Badges

Recipients 

Grand Crosses
 Souphanouvong
 Victoria, Crown Princess of Sweden
Cordons
 Valdas Adamkus
 Akihito
 Albert II of Belgium
 List of titles and honours of Beatrix of the Netherlands
 Carl XVI Gustaf
 Marie-Louise Coleiro Preca
 Emil Constantinescu
 Jean-Luc Dehaene
 Süleyman Demirel
 Haakon, Crown Prince of Norway
 Harald V of Norway
 Henrik, Prince Consort of Denmark
 Thomas Klestil
 Margrethe II of Denmark
 Mette-Marit, Crown Princess of Norway
 Queen Paola of Belgium
 Dilma Rousseff
 Nicolas Sarkozy
 Queen Silvia of Sweden
 Queen Sonja of Norway
 Hamad bin Khalifa Al Thani
 Victoria, Crown Princess of Sweden
 Zhelyu Zhelev
1st Class with Swords (Military)
 Kliment Boyadzhiev
 Radko Dimitriev
 Ivan Fichev
 Frederik, Crown Prince of Denmark
 Georgi Ivanov (cosmonaut)
 Prince Joachim of Denmark
 Stiliyan Kovachev
 Vasil Kutinchev
 Mihail Savov
 Georgi Todorov (general)
 Stefan Toshev
1st Class (Civilian)
 Aleksandr Panayotov Aleksandrov
 Cécilia Attias
 Irina Bokova
 Jaap de Hoop Scheffer
 Ignat Kaneff
 Krzysztof Krajewski
 Mary, Crown Princess of Denmark
 Louis Michel
 Alois Mock
 Bujar Nishani
 Colin Powell
 Anders Fogh Rasmussen
Other or Unknown Classes
 Ivan Abadzhiev
 Nicolae Ceaușescu
 Benita Ferrero-Waldner
 Gustáv Husák
 Islam Karimov
 Jarosław Lindenberg
 Tatyana Lolova
 Musa Manarov
 Georgi Markov
 Yordan Radichkov
 Wincenty Rzymowski
 Viktor Savinykh
 Anatoly Solovyev
 Vladimir Georgiyevich Titov
 Rangel Valchanov

See also 
 List of honours of Bulgaria awarded to heads of state and royalty

References

External links

 Law on the Orders and the Medals of the Republic of Bulgaria. 
 Collection of orders, insignia and medals of the National Museum of Military History. 
 Information on the International Botev Prize.